4D Sports Tennis (also known as World Tour Tennis, World Tennis Championships and Compaq Grand Slam Cup) is a 3D Tennis computer game with motion capture animation of the 4D Sports series.  The game uses untextured 3D polygon graphics.

See also 
 4D Sports Boxing
 4D Sports Driving - also known as Stunts

Notes

External links
 

1990 video games
DOS games
FM Towns games 
NEC PC-9801 games
Tennis video games
Video games developed in Canada
Distinctive Software games
Single-player video games
Mindscape games